Estivareilles is a commune in the Allier department in central France. It lies about 10 km north of Montluçon on the right-hand side of the Cher river. There is a Lavoir (a public washing basin), a lantern of the dead and a church from the nineteenth century.

Population

See also
Communes of the Allier department

References

External links
 The official web site of the mayor of Estivareilles
 Estivareilles page at the National Geographical Institute (archived)

Communes of Allier
Allier communes articles needing translation from French Wikipedia